The 1953 Lower Hutt mayoral election was part of the New Zealand local elections held that same year. The elections were held for the role of Mayor of Lower Hutt plus other local government positions including fifteen city councillors, also elected triennially. The polling was conducted using the standard first-past-the-post electoral method.

Background
A major talking point in the lead up to the election was the potential of a clash with the 1953 Royal Tour. There were proposals to postpone local elections until early 1954 over fears of reduced turnout due to a conflicted schedule. The proposals were considered by the Minister of Internal Affairs William Bodkin, who ultimately decided against it.

The incumbent Mayor, Percy Dowse, sought re-election for a second term. Dowse was opposed by Citizens' Association candidate and former deputy mayor Eric Rothwell who had been a councillor from 1944 to 1950. The election marked the first under an increased membership of fifteen councillors rather than twelve. The election resulted in another landslide victory for the Labour ticket, winning the mayoralty and every council seat.

Mayoral results

Councillor results

Notes

References

Mayoral elections in Lower Hutt
1953 elections in New Zealand
Politics of the Wellington Region